The 1936–37 İstanbul Football League season was the 29th season of the league. Fenerbahçe SK won the league for the 9th time.

Season

References

Istanbul Football League seasons
Turkey
2